Kalicki (feminine: Kalicka; plural: Kaliccy) is a Polish surname. It may refer to:

 Jan Kalicki (1922–1953), Polish mathematician
 Jan Kalicki (drummer), British musician
 Kim Kalicki (born 1997), German bobsledder
 Włodzimierz Kalicki (born 1955), Polish writer

See also
 

Polish-language surnames